Zafar Khan may refer to:

Zafar Khan (Indian general) (died 1299), general of the Delhi Sultanate
Zafar Khan (Afghan general) (born 1953), general of the Afghan National Army
Zafar Khan (businessman) (born 1968), British businessman
Zafar Muhammad Khan (died 1971), Pakistani naval officer
Ala-ud-Din Bahman Shah (died 1358), born Zafar Khan, founder of the Kingdom of Bahmani
Muzaffar Shah I (died 1411), born Zafar Khan, founder of the Gujarat Sultanate

See also
Zafar Khan Malik Dinar, Indian slave general of Delhi Sultanate